The Importance of Being Idle may refer to:

 The Importance of Being Idle (book), a book by Stephen Robins
 "The Importance of Being Idle" (song), a song by the band Oasis